Nowhere Boys is an Australian teen-oriented television drama series created by Tony Ayres. It premiered on ABC3 on 7 November 2013. The first two series follow the adventures of four mismatched teenage boys: goth Felix Ferne (Dougie Baldwin), nerd Andrew "Andy" Lau (Joel Lok), golden child Sam Conte (Rahart Adams), and alpha jock Jake Riles (Matt Testro). On 4 April 2014, it was announced that Nowhere Boys had been renewed for a second series. It began airing on 23 November 2014. A third series of Nowhere Boys, titled Two Moons Rising, began screening from November 11, 2016, with a new cast and characters, replacing the original cast members. The fourth and final series, titled Battle For Negative Space, started airing on 3 December 2018.

Series overview

Episodes

Series 1 (2013–14)

Series 2 (2014–15)

Film: The Book of Shadows (2016)

Series 3: Two Moons Rising (2016–17)

Series 4: Battle for Negative Space (2018)

References

Lists of Australian children's television series episodes
Lists of Australian drama television series episodes
Lists of fantasy television series episodes